Janet Johnson may refer to:

Janet Ramsay Johnson (1914–1983), Australian born actress
Janet Julian (born 1959), American actress also credited under her birth name Janet Louise Johnson
Janet Johnson (Egyptologist), American Egyptologist and academic 
Janet Johnson (Arkansas politician), state legislator
Janet Johnson (Minnesota politician) (1940–1999), American politician